Oleksandr Ihorovych Volovyk (born 28 October 1985) is a Ukrainian professional football defender and assistant manager of Podillya Khmelnytskyi.

Career
On 10 June 2013 Volovyk signed 4-years contract with FC Shakhtar.

On 20 August 2015, Belgian club Oud-Heverlee Leuven announced that Volovyk was arriving on loan for one season.

References

External links
 
 

1985 births
Living people
Ukrainian footballers
People from Krasyliv
Ukrainian Premier League players
Ukrainian First League players
Ukrainian Second League players
FC Podillya Khmelnytskyi players
FC Stal Alchevsk players
FC Metalurh Donetsk players
FC Shakhtar Donetsk players
Oud-Heverlee Leuven players
FC Aktobe players
Belgian Pro League players
Expatriate footballers in Belgium
Ukrainian expatriate footballers
Ukrainian expatriate sportspeople in Belgium
Expatriate footballers in Kazakhstan
Ukrainian expatriate sportspeople in Kazakhstan
Association football defenders
FC Akzhayik players
Sportspeople from Khmelnytskyi Oblast